The Islamic holy books are certain religious scriptures that are viewed by Muslims as having valid divine significance, in that they were authored by God (Allah) through a variety of prophets and messengers, including those who predate the Quran. 

Muslims hold the Quran, as it was revealed to Muhammad, to be God's final revelation to mankind, and therefore a completion and confirmation of previous scriptures, such as the Bible. Despite the primacy that Muslims place upon the Quran in this context, belief in the validity of earlier Abrahamic scriptures is one of the six Islamic articles of faith. However, for most self-identified Muslims, the level of this belief is restricted by the concept of tahrif.

Among the group of religious texts considered to be valid pre-Islamic revelations, the three that are mentioned by name in the Quran are the Tawrat, received by prophets and messengers amongst the Children of Israel; the Psalms, received by David; and the Gospel, received by Jesus. Additionally, the Quran mentions God's revealing of the Scrolls of Abraham and the Scrolls of Moses.

Major books

Quran 

The Quran is the central religious text of Islam, which Muslims believe to be a revelation from God (Allah). The Quran is divided into chapters (surah), which are then divided into verses (ayah). Muslims believe the Quran was verbally revealed by Allah to Muhammad through the angel Gabriel (Jibril), gradually over a period of approximately 23 years, starting in late 609, when Muhammad was 39, and concluding in 632, the year of his death. Muslims regard the Quran as the most important miracle of Muhammad, a proof of his prophethood, and the culmination of a series of divine messages that started with the messages revealed to Adam and ended with Muhammad. It is widely regarded as the finest work in classical Arabic literature.

Tawrat (Torah) 

The "Tawrat" (also Tawrah or Taurat) is the Arabic name for the Torah within its context as an Islamic holy book believed by Muslims to have been given by God to the prophets and messengers amongst the Children of Israel. When referring to traditions from the Tawrat, Muslims have not only identified it with the Pentateuch, but also with the other books of the Hebrew Bible as well as with Talmudic and Midrashim writings.

Zabur (Psalms) 

The Quran mentions the Zabur,  interpreted as being the Book of Psalms, as being the holy scripture revealed to King David (Dawud). Scholars have often understood the Psalms to have been holy songs of praise, and not a book administering law.

Injil (Gospel) 

The Injil was the holy book revealed to Jesus (Isa), according to the Quran. Although some lay Muslims believe the Injil refers to the entire New Testament, most scholars and Muslims believe that it refers not to the New Testament but to an original Gospel, given to Jesus as the word of Allah. Therefore, according to Muslim belief, the Gospel was the message that Jesus, being divinely inspired, preached to the Children of Israel. The current canonical Gospels, in the belief of Muslim scholars, are not divinely revealed but rather are documents of the life of Jesus, as written by various contemporaries, disciples and companions. These Gospels, in Muslim belief, contain portions of the teachings of Jesus, but neither represent nor contain the original Gospel from Allah.

Additional scriptures 
The Quran also mentions two ancient scrolls and possibly another book:

Scrolls of Abraham 
The Scrolls of Abraham (Arabic: صحف إبراهيم‎, Ṣuḥuf ʾIbrāhīm) are believed to have been one of the earliest bodies of scripture, which were given to Abraham (Ibrāhīm), and later used by Ishmael (Ismā‘īl) and Isaac (Isḥāq). Although usually referred to as "scrolls", many translators have translated the Arabic suhuf as "books". The verse mentioning the "Scriptures" is in Quran 87:18-19 where they are referred to, alongside the Scrolls of Moses, to have been "Books of Earlier Revelation".

Scrolls of Moses 
The Scrolls of Moses (Ṣuḥuf Mūsā) are an ancient body of scripture mentioned twice in the Quran. They are part of the religious scriptures of Islam. Jordanian scholar and professor of philosophy Ghazi bin Muhammad mentions that the "Scrolls of Moses" are identical to the Torah of Moses. Others have stated that they could possibly refer to the Book of the Wars of the Lord, a lost text spoken of in the Old Testament or Tanakh in the Book of Numbers. The verse mentioning the "Scriptures" is in Quran 87:18-19 where they are referred to, alongside the Scrolls of Abraham, to have been "Books of Earlier Revelation".

Book of John the Baptist 
The Quran mentions that wisdom and a Book (“Kitab”) was given to prophet John the Baptist:

See also 

 Biblical and Quranic narratives
 Canonization of Islamic scripture
 List of Islamic texts
 List of Shia books
 Prophets and messengers in Islam
 Sunnah

References 

Islamic theology
Islamic texts
Religious texts